Toshiko – Her Trio, Her Quartet is a jazz album recorded by pianist Toshiko Akiyoshi in New York, in 1956, and released on the Storyville record label.  The album cover artwork is taken from Joan Miró's "Black and Red" series.

Track listing
LP side A
"Kelo" (J. J. Johnson) – 4:20
"Salute to Shorty" (Akiyoshi) – 3:06
"Pea, Bee and Lee" (Akiyoshi) – 3:15
"Taking a Chance on Love" (Duke, Latouche, Fetter) – 4:34
LP side B
"All the Things You Are" (Kern) – 4:32
"No Moon at All" (Evans, Mann) – 4:52
"I'll Remember April" (DePaul, Raye, Johnston) – 5:30
"Thou Swell" (Rodgers, Hart) – 4:55

Personnel
Tracks 1, 2, 4, 5, 7:
Toshiko Akiyoshi –  piano
Boots Mussulli –  alto saxophone
Ed Thigpen –  drums 
Wyatt Ruther –  bass 
Tracks 3, 6, 8:
Toshiko Akiyoshi –  piano
Roy Haynes –  drums 
Oscar Pettiford –  bass

References

Storyville STLP-918

External links
Time magazine review, 1958 January

Toshiko Akiyoshi albums
1956 albums
Storyville Records (George Wein's) albums